Simon Hedley Dalrymple (born 6 June 1983) is an English former cricketer.

Born in Worcester, Dalrymple was educated at Radley and Christ Church, Oxford. He made two first-class appearances for Oxford University Cricket Club in 2002 and 2004, both against Cambridge University. A middle-order batsman, he scored 40 runs in total, with a highest of 15 not out.

He is the younger brother of former Glamorgan captain Jamie Dalrymple.

References

1983 births
English cricketers
Oxford University cricketers
Living people
Sportspeople from Worcester, England
People educated at Radley College
Alumni of Christ Church, Oxford